A whipped cream charger is a steel cylinder or cartridge filled with nitrous oxide (N2O) that is used as a whipping agent in a whipped cream dispenser. The narrow end of a charger has a foil covering that is broken to release the gas. This is usually done by a sharp pin inside the whipped cream dispenser. The nitrous oxide in chargers is also used as an oxidizer in hybrid model rocket engines.

Nitrous oxide is a popular recreational drug, and whipped cream chargers are a convenient source of the gas. Among users, the chargers are colloquially called whippets, nos, nossies or nangs.

The kitchen appliance that receives the charger is a whipping siphon.

Description 

While refillable chargers were once available, all chargers are now non-refillable; the latter consist entirely of recyclable steel.

Production 
In Europe, where the production and use of whip cream chargers originated, there are presently three factories involved in its production. Their standard capacity is 7.8 grams of nitrous oxide.

Application 

Whipped cream chargers are intended for low-volume or occasional use, such as home kitchens, restaurants, and coffee shop applications. 

For very high volume commercial use, there are regulated tank systems for filling much larger containers and dispensing more whipped cream. These are desirable if the volume is more than a production level of ten litres per hour.

Uses

Culinary 

Nitrous oxide is used because it dissolves easily into the cream, and does not cause the cream to oxidize while it is in the can.
The cream must have a minimum fat content of 28% to produce whipped cream with a dispenser. The recipe for the cream to be whipped typically calls for heavy cream and sugar, along with any desired flavorings or colorings. In a sealed container, this cream is pressurized with nitrous oxide, which dissolves into the cream as per its lipophilicity.

When the cream dispenser's valve is opened, the cream solution is expelled by the high pressure inside. The change in pressure causes some of the dissolved gas to return to bubbles, effectively fluffing up the cream. Nitrous oxide is bacteriostatic (it inhibits bacteria growth), so a charged cream dispenser can be kept in the refrigerator for up to two weeks.

Recreational drug 

Because of their availability, chargers are usually the method of choice for users seeking to use nitrous oxide recreationally. Tanks of medical-grade nitrous are difficult to obtain, and auto-grade nitrous contains substances such as sulfur dioxide to prevent human consumption. Chargers are cheaply available in many stores and online.

To inhale from a charger, users either fill a balloon using a cracker, fill an empty whipped cream dispenser and inhale from it, or likewise use a dispenser to fill a balloon as the potentially rapid rush of gas from the spout of the dispenser may be too harsh. Inhaling directly from a cracker is particularly dangerous due to the risk of developing frostbite on the inside of the mouth or esophagus. The 8 gram nitrous oxide steel cylinder charger when discharged into an empty whipped cream dispenser creates a pressure of 30 pounds per square inch (200kPa) and delivers 3.24 litres of nitrous oxide gas.

Model rocketry 
Whipped cream chargers are also used by model rocket enthusiasts for micro hybrid engines, where it acts as an oxidizer for solid fuels such as polyethylene or HTPB.

See also 
 Powerlet

References

External links 
 
 
 Microscale Gas Chemistry: Experiments with Nitrous Oxide
Containers
Substance-related disorders